Sagene Depot is a disused, but not abandoned tram depot in Stockfleths gate at Sagene in Oslo, Norway.  Two hall units, several apartments and offices, a forge and a workshop constitute the depot.  The two hall units are preserved, and are now used as a cultural meeting place.

History
In 1902, three years after the Sagene Line had opened, Kristiania Kommunale Sporveie built one hall unit for the tramway. An additional hall unit was later constructed.

Facilities
There were two depots that were put up adjacent at Sagene.  They were built at municipally owned ground and had places for 36 cars.

Next to the depot, a building with apartment and office was put up, constructed in brick.  The depot chief lived in an apartment in the first stock.

References
Notes

Bibliography

Oslo Tramway depots